1973 Emperor's Cup Final was the 53rd final of the Emperor's Cup competition. The final was played at National Stadium in Tokyo on January 1, 1974. Mitsubishi Motors won the championship.

Overview
Mitsubishi Motors won their 2nd title, by defeating defending champion Hitachi 2–1.

Match details

See also
1973 Emperor's Cup

References

Emperor's Cup
1973 in Japanese football
Urawa Red Diamonds matches
Kashiwa Reysol matches